Auge-Saint-Médard is a former commune in the Charente department in southwestern France. Situated within it are small villages; Auge, Saint-Médard, and La Bréchoire. On 1 January 2019, it was merged into the new commune Val-d'Auge.

Population

See also
Communes of the Charente department

References

Former communes of Charente